Doug Nye (born October 1945) is an English motoring journalist and author. He lives in Farnham, Surrey, England.

He is generally recognised as a world authority on competition cars of any period from 1887, and is a consultant to the Bonhams auction house, the Collier Collection (in the USA) and sits on the Advisory Council of the British National Motor Museum at Beaulieu. He has also consulted for The Dutch National Motor Museum, the Brooklands Museum in England, McLaren International and McLaren Cars Limited.  He was a founding consultant to the SpeedVision TV network in the USA and to the Donington Collection of single-seater racing cars, is Historical Consultant (founding) to Goodwood Motorsport – creators of the Goodwood Festival of Speed and the Goodwood Revival Meeting, and a member of the Historians Council of the International Motor Racing Research Center at Watkins Glen, NY.

At the age of 18 he went straight from grammar school to the staff of Motor Racing magazine based at Brands Hatch. Since then he has written more than 70 motor racing books.

He has presented assorted TV programmes covering motor racing and collectors' cars, and since 2004 – with colleague David Weguelin has produced the Motorfilms Quarterly series of 90-minute archival movie DVDs/video tapes.

He has also been, or is currently, a regular contributor to The Daily Telegraph and Motor Sport.

In November 2022, for his body of work over more than 50 years, the Royal Automobile Club Motoring Book of the Year panel presented him with a Lifetime Achievement Award.

Publications 
partial list

References

External links
http://www.allbookstores.com/author/Doug_Nye.html Books by D Nye.
http://www.books.co.uk/authors/doug_nye/

Living people
British motoring journalists
Historians of motorsport
Formula One journalists and reporters
English motorsport people
1945 births